Helen Nichol or Nicol may refer to:

Helen Nichol (badminton) (born 1981), Canadian badminton player
Helen Nicol (1920–2021), Canadian baseball pitcher
Phyllis Fraser (1916–2006), American actress, journalist, and children's book publisher, born Helen Brown Nichols
Helen Nicol (suffragist) (1854–1932), New Zealand temperance and suffrage activist